Narapati of Prome (died February 1539) was king of Prome from 1532 to 1539. He seized the throne after his father Bayin Htwe was taken captive by the Confederation of Shan States in 1532 back to Upper Burma. Bayin Htwe escaped after the Confederation's leader Sawlon was assassinated by his ministers, and returned to Prome (Pyay), c. May 1533. But Narapati shut the gates against his father, who soon died in the adjoining forests.

Narapati remained a nominal vassal to Confederation controlled Ava. Although his authority did not extend beyond the immediate region around Prome, he became ensnarled in the Toungoo–Hanthawaddy War (1534–41). Narapati was an ally of King Takayutpi of Hanthawaddy, and was married to Takayutpi's sister. Narapati provided shelter to the fleeing Hanthawaddy troops in 1538–39. When Toungoo troops attacked a heavily fortified Prome, Narapati asked for help from the Confederation in Ava. The Confederation troops broke the siege, but refused to follow up on the retreating Toungoo armies.

Narapati formed an alliance with Mrauk U Kingdom of Arakan by sending his sister and his queen (Takayutpi's sister) to King Min Bin of Mrauk U. (Takayutpi had died soon after the battle.) Narapati too died soon after. He was succeeded by his half-brother Minkhaung.

Ancestry
The following is his ancestry as reported in the Hmannan Yazawin chronicle, which in turn referenced contemporary inscriptions. His parents were double cousins.

Notes

References

Bibliography
 
 
 

Prome dynasty
1539 deaths
Year of birth unknown
16th-century Burmese monarchs